Piz Pazzola is a mountain of the Swiss Lepontine Alps, situated near Sedrun in the canton of Graubünden. It lies on the range west of the Val Medel.

References

External links
 Piz Pazzola on Hikr

Mountains of Graubünden
Mountains of the Alps
Lepontine Alps
Mountains of Switzerland